L'Espurgatoire Seint Patriz or The Legend of the Purgatory of Saint Patrick is a 12th-century poem by Marie de France.  It is an Old French translation of a Latin text Tractatus de Purgatorio Sancti Patricii by the monk Henry of Saltrey.  However, Marie's version is amplified from the original Latin.

Plot summary

In this work, an Irish knight named Owein travels to St. Patrick's Purgatory to atone for his sins.  After descending into purgatory, he is visited by several demons who show him unholy scenes of torture to try to get him to renounce his religion.  Each time, he is able to dispel the scene by saying the name of Jesus Christ.  After passing an entire night in the Purgatory, he returns to the church where he began his journey, purged of his sins.

Influence
St Patrick's Purgatory, a ballad by Robert Southey, is directly based on the legend.

References

Further reading
Morrison, Susan Signe. "Marie de France's Saint Patrick’s Purgatory as Dynamic Diptych." Le Cygne: Journal of the International Marie de France Society, 3rd Series, 6 (2019): 49-65.

External links
 L'Espurgatoire Seint Patriz on Google Books, text in Old French.

Visionary poems
Works by Marie de France
French poems
Medieval literature